Macaulay, McAuley, MacAuley, and Macauley are Scottish and Irish surnames. There are several etymological origins for the names: all of which originated as patronyms in Gaelic languages—Irish and Scottish Gaelic. Although these English-language (Anglicized) forms of the surnames are ultimately derived from Gaelic patronyms, they do not refer to the actual name of the bearer's father. The surname is quite common in Ireland, particularly in Ulster.

Etymology
In some cases, the surnames are derived from the Scottish Gaelic MacAmhalghaidh, and Irish Mac Amhalghaidh. These Gaelic surnames translates into English as "son of Amhalghaidh" or "son of Amhalghadh". The Gaelic surnames originated as a patronyms, however they no longer refer to the actual names of the bearer's father's. The personal name Amhalghaidh (also spelt Amhalghadh) is an old Gaelic name, and its etymological origin and meaning are uncertain.

In other cases, the surnames are derived from the Scottish Gaelic MacAmhlaibh or MacAmhlaidh, or the Irish Mac Amhlaoibh. These surnames translate into English as "son of Amhlaibh"; "son of Amhladh" or "son of Amhlaidh"; and "son of Amhlaoibh". The surnames originated as a patronyms, however they no longer refer to the actual name of the bearer's father. The names Amhlaibh, Amhladh, Amhlaidh, and Amhlaoibh are Gaelic derivatives of the Old Norse personal names Áleifr and Óláfr.

Distribution

Ireland (including the Republic of Ireland and Northern Ireland)
In Ireland, the surnames are very common in the province of Ulster; they are also common in Dublin, in the Republic of Ireland.

United States
In 1990, the United States Census Bureau undertook a study of the 1990 United States Census, and released a sample of data concerning the most common names. According to this sample of 6.3 million people (who had 88,799 unique last names), "MACAULEY" (including MacAuley and Macauley) ranked 20,117th most common last name, and was borne by 0.000 percent of the population sample. "MCAULEY" (McAuley) was much more common; it ranked 7,139th most common last name, and was borne by 0.002 percent of the population sample. Within the 2000 United States Census, "MACAULEY" was the 15,676th most common last name, with 1,711 occurrences. "MCAULEY" was the 7,765th most common last name, with 3,946 occurrences. The table below shows data concerning racial-ethnic aspects of the surnames in the 2000 United States Census.

Scotland
McAuley, MacAuley, and Macauley were not amongst the 100 most common surnames recorded in birth, death, and marriage registers in Scotland, in 1995. None of the surnames ranked amongst the 100 most common surnames recorded in birth, death, and marriage registrations in the combined years of 1999, 2000, and 2001. None of the surnames ranked amongst the most common surnames recorded in Scotland, in the United Kingdom Census 1901.

People with the surname
Macaulay
Fred MacAulay (born 1956), Scottish comedian
Thomas Babington Macaulay, British politician, historian, writer and colonial administrator.
MacAuley
Alexander MacAuley (footballer), Scottish footballer
Morton MacAuley, Canadian politician.
Macauley
Ed Macauley, (1928–2011), American, professional basketball player known by the nickname "Easy Ed Macauley".
James Macauley, (1889–1945), Irish, professional footballer.
Robie Macauley, (1919–1995), American, writer and editor.
Steve Macauley, (born 1969), English, professional footballer.
McAuley
Alphonso McAuley, American, actor.
Andrew McAuley, (1968–2007), Australian, adventurer.
Bob McAuley, (born 1904), Scottish-Canadian, football player.
Bryn McAuley, (born 1989), Canadian, voice actress.
Catherine McAuley, (1787–1841), Irish, Catholic nun and founder of the Sisters of Mercy.
Charles McAuley, (1910–1999), Irish, painter.
Dave McAuley, (born 1961), Northern Irish, professional boxer.
Gareth McAuley, (born 1979), Northern Irish, professional footballer.
Gareth McAuley, (born 1992), Northern Irish, sports shooter. Bronze medalist in Men’s skeet at the 2018 Commonwealth Games
Hugh McAuley (footballer, born 1953), English professional footballer and coach.
Hugh McAuley (footballer, born 1976), English professional footballer.
Ike McAuley, (1891–1928), American, professional baseball player.
James McAuley, (1917–1976), Australian, academic, journalist.
Jimmy McAuley, (born 1901), Northern Irish, football player.
Jerry McAuley, (1839–1884), Irish born American, convicted criminal who founded America's first gospel rescue mission.
Ken McAuley, (1931–1992) Canadian, professional ice hockey player.
Linda McAuley, radio presenter.
Maria McAuley, (1847–1919), co-founder of the McAuley Water St Mission, in New York City. 
Pat McAuley, (1921–1970), Scottish, footballer.
Paul J. McAuley, (born 1955), British, author.
Pearse McAuley, (born c. 1965), Irish, Provisional IRA Volunteer.
Robin McAuley, (born 1953), Irish, musician.
Roisin McAuley, Irish, novelist.
Sean McAuley, (born 1972), English, footballer
Tony McAuley, (born 1939), Irish, TV and radio director and producer
William McAuley, (born 1975), better known by his stage name Bleu, American musician, singer, songwriter, and record producer

References

English-language surnames
Anglicised Irish-language surnames
Patronymic surnames
Surnames from given names